Everaldo de Jesus Pereira, also known as Cabore (born February 19, 1980, in Salvador) is a  Brazilian former footballer who last played as a forward for Qatar Stars League side Umm-Salal.

Career
In 2007, he won South Korea's K-League top scorer with 18 goals.

From August 15 until September 27, he recorded a goal or an assist from 8 games and he was recorded in successive 2 place.

After an unsuccessful period at FC Tokyo of J1 League, he moved to Qatar to play for Al-Arabi in 2009 and then he became the top scorer of 2009/10 Qatari League. In addition, he won the 2010 Sheikh Jassem Cup for Al-Arabi, scoring a late winner and the only goal of the match. However, replays of the goal revealed it was a clear handball which was not spotted by the referee.

After his tenure at Al Arabi, he moved to Umm-Salal, making his debut against his former club.

Club statistics

Honours

Individual honour
 K League Top scorer  : 2007
 Qatar Stars League Top scorer : 2009/10

References

 SPORTS 2.0

External links

 
 QSL.com.qa Player profile 

1980 births
Living people
Association football forwards
Brazilian footballers
Brazilian expatriate footballers
Ipatinga Futebol Clube players
Esporte Clube Vitória players
Bonsucesso Futebol Clube players
Ituano FC players
Gyeongnam FC players
FC Tokyo players
K League 1 players
J1 League players
Expatriate footballers in South Korea
Expatriate footballers in Japan
Sportspeople from Salvador, Bahia
Brazilian expatriate sportspeople in South Korea
Brazilian expatriate sportspeople in Japan
Al-Arabi SC (Qatar) players
Qatar Stars League players
Expatriate footballers in Qatar